Chum may refer to:

Broadcasting 
 CHUM Limited, a defunct Canadian media company
 CHUM Radio, now Bell Media Radio, a Canadian radio broadcasting company
 CHUM (AM), a Toronto radio station
 CHUM-FM, a Toronto radio station
 CHUM Chart, a Canadian record chart
 Chums, a segment on the TV series SMTV Live

People 
 Chum Bunrong (born 1950), Cambodian diplomat
 Choun Chum (born 1986), Cambodian footballer
 Khieu Chum (1907–1975), Cambodian Buddhist monk
 Chum Mey (born ), Cambodian genocide survivor
 Chum Taylor (born 1927), Australian motorcycle speedway rider

Other uses 
 Chum, a mako shark character in Finding Nemo
 "Chum" (song), by American rapper Earl Sweatshirt
 Chum (tent)
 Chum salmon (Oncorhynchus keta)
 Chumming, a fishing practice
 Chums (paper), a defunct British boys newspaper
 Centre hospitalier de l'Université de Montréal, a university hospital network in Montreal, Canada
 Chums Scout Patrols, early Scouting groups
 Como, Italy